is a passenger railway station located in the city of Mimasaka, Okayama Prefecture, Japan, operated by West Japan Railway Company (JR West).

Lines

Station layout
The station consists of one ground-level side platform serving a single bi-directional track. It formerly had one island platform and two tracks, but one side has been removed (the track space is now the site of an apartment building). The station is attended.

Adjacent stations

History
Hayashino Station opened on November 28, 1934.  With the privatization of the Japan National Railways (JNR) on April 1, 1987, the station came under the aegis of the West Japan Railway Company. A new station building was completed in February 2021.

Passenger statistics
In fiscal 2019, the station was used by an average of 116 passengers daily..

Surrounding area
Mimasaka City Hall

See also
List of railway stations in Japan

References

External links

 Hayashino Station Official Site

Railway stations in Okayama Prefecture
Kishin Line
Railway stations in Japan opened in 1934
Mimasaka, Okayama